Kiladze is a Georgian surname. It may refer to
Iago Kiladze (born 1986), Georgian (until 2006) and Ukrainian (since 2007) professional boxer 
Nika Kiladze (1988–2014), Georgian football player
Rolan Kiladze (1931–2010), Georgian astronomer

Georgian-language surnames
Surnames of Georgian origin